Billington and Langho is a civil parish in the Ribble Valley district of Lancashire, England, covering the villages of Billington and Langho and the hamlets of York and Old Langho and the gated community called Brockhall Village.

According to the 2001 census the parish had a population of 4,555, however the United Kingdom Census 2011 grouped the parish with Dinckley (2001 pop. 83), giving a total of 5,415.

Schools 
There are three schools in the Billington and Langho area;
 St Augustine's RC High School, Billington
 St Leonards Primary School
 St Mary's Primary School

See also

Listed buildings in Billington and Langho

References

External links 
 https://web.archive.org/web/20091012015754/http://www.communigate.co.uk/lancs/billingtonandlanghocommunitycentre/
 Website of the parish council

Civil parishes in Lancashire
Geography of Ribble Valley